Bonvin is a surname. Notable people with the surname include:

Christophe Bonvin (born 1965), Swiss footballer
François Bonvin (1817–1887), French painter
Gilbert Bonvin (1931–1983), French footballer
Léon Bonvin (1834–1866), French painter
Louis Bonvin (1886–1946), French diplomat and general
Pablo Facundo Bonvín (born 1981), Argentine footballer
Roger Bonvin (1907–1982), Swiss politician

See also
Mont Bonvin, is a mountain of the Bernese Alps, overlooking Crans-Montana in the Swiss canton of Valais

References